Anthony Shaw (born 23 July 1960) is a former Australian rules footballer, coach and media personality who played for the Collingwood Football Club.

Playing career

Collingwood Football Club
Shaw was recruited to Collingwood from Reservoir-Lakeside to make his debut in 1977 alongside brother Ray. He was a small midfielder at 170 cm who didn't have the natural ability or quality skills of others but his courage and determination made him a fine rover. He did struggle in his early years to cement a senior position in the team. Shaw played in the 1980–1981 losing Grand Final sides.

In 1984, Shaw won the Copeland Trophy as the Magpies best and fairest player for the season, as well as playing with second brother Neville. After another couple seasons of the club failing to make the finals, Shaw took over the captaincy left by Mark Williams in 1987, but the side failed in the new-look competition, finishing 12th.

In 1990, Shaw captained the club to a historic premiership, the club's first in 32 years, defeating Essendon. Shaw's 35 touches saw him earn the Norm Smith Medal as best on the ground. In the same season, Shaw won his second Copeland Trophy.

In 1991, against the Brisbane Bears, Shaw had 50 disposals, which was at the time the second most disposals recorded in a game by a single player (trailing Greg Williams' record of 53 set in 1989).

Injuries got the better of him in years to come, but he continued impressing as a centreman despite the constant struggle of getting on the park injury-free. At the end of 1993, he was considering retirement but played on, despite handing the captaincy to premiership team-mate Gavin Brown. 1994 was his last year, but he broke several records. In round nine, against North Melbourne, he played his 300th game, and nine weeks later against Footscray, he broke Gordon Coventry's club VFL/AFL games record of 306 games. Shaw's last game was played at the WACA in an elimination final which the Magpies lost by two points.

Shaw retired in a tearful farewell with playing a total of 313 VFL/AFL games and kicked a total of 157 goals for Collingwood Football Club from 1978 until 1994.

Statistics

Playing statistics
 

|- style=background:#EAEAEA
| scope=row | 1978 ||  || 56,32
| 5 || 6 || 2 || 42 || 22 || 64 || 10 ||  || 1.2 || 0.4 || 8.4 || 4.4 || 12.8 || 2.0 ||  || 0
|-
| scope=row | 1979 ||  || 22
| 15 || 8 || 7 || 227 || 113 || 340 || 41 ||  || 0.5 || 0.5 || 15.1 || 7.5 || 22.7 || 2.7 ||  || 0
|- style=background:#EAEAEA
| scope=row | 1980 ||  || 22
| 18 || 14 || 12 || 190 || 88 || 278 || 35 ||  || 0.8 || 0.7 || 10.6 || 4.9 || 15.4 || 1.9 ||  || 0
|-
| scope=row | 1981 ||  || 22
| 25 || 19 || 18 || 413 || 227 || 640 || 70 ||  || 0.8 || 0.7 || 16.5 || 9.1 || 25.6 || 2.8 ||  || 6
|- style=background:#EAEAEA
| scope=row | 1982 ||  || 22
| 20 || 18 || 8 || 294 || 206 || 500 || 56 ||  || 0.9 || 0.4 || 14.7 || 10.3 || 25.0 || 2.8 ||  || 4
|-
| scope=row | 1983 ||  || 22
| 22 || 14 || 14 || 299 || 216 || 515 || 86 ||  || 0.6 || 0.6 || 13.6 || 9.8 || 23.4 || 3.9 ||  || 0
|- style=background:#EAEAEA
| scope=row | 1984 ||  || 22
| 23 || 15 || 19 || 396 || 280 || 676 || 119 ||  || 0.7 || 0.8 || 17.2 || 12.2 || 29.4 || 5.2 ||  || 6
|-
| scope=row | 1985 ||  || 22
| 22 || 11 || 10 || 360 || 240 || 600 || 114 ||  || 0.5 || 0.5 || 16.4 || 10.9 || 27.3 || 5.2 ||  || 10
|- style=background:#EAEAEA
| scope=row | 1986 ||  || 22
| 20 || 10 || 7 || 328 || 218 || 546 || 84 ||  || 0.5 || 0.4 || 16.4 || 10.9 || 27.3 || 4.2 ||  || 5
|-
| scope=row | 1987 ||  || 22
| 16 || 3 || 2 || 221 || 151 || 372 || 49 || 38 || 0.2 || 0.1 || 13.8 || 9.4 || 23.3 || 3.1 || 2.4 || 0
|- style=background:#EAEAEA
| scope=row | 1988 ||  || 22
| 20 || 9 || 10 || 316 || 203 || 519 || 89 || 34 || 0.5 || 0.5 || 15.8 || 10.2 || 26.0 || 4.5 || 1.7 || 4
|-
| scope=row | 1989 ||  || 22
| 14 || 6 || 7 || 208 || 141 || 349 || 56 || 23 || 0.4 || 0.5 || 14.9 || 10.1 || 24.9 || 4.0 || 1.6 || 5
|- style=background:#EAEAEA
| scope=row bgcolor=F0E68C | 1990# ||  || 22
| 26 || 7 || 11 || 459 || 277 || 736 || 105 || 55 || 0.3 || 0.4 || 17.7 || 10.7 || 28.3 || 4.0 || 2.1 || 13
|-
| scope=row | 1991 ||  || 22
| 18 || 8 || 7 || 316 || 202 || 518 || 57 || 35 || 0.4 || 0.4 || 17.6 || 11.2 || 28.8 || 3.2 || 1.9 || 3
|- style=background:#EAEAEA
| scope=row | 1992 ||  || 22
| 17 || 3 || 2 || 244 || 162 || 406 || 74 || 30 || 0.2 || 0.1 || 14.4 || 9.5 || 23.9 || 4.4 || 1.8 || 4
|-
| scope=row | 1993 ||  || 22
| 12 || 1 || 3 || 133 || 119 || 252 || 36 || 30 || 0.1 || 0.3 || 11.1 || 9.9 || 21.0 || 3.0 || 2.5 || 0
|- style=background:#EAEAEA
| scope=row | 1994 ||  || 22
| 20 || 5 || 2 || 141 || 180 || 321 || 40 || 28 || 0.3 || 0.1 || 7.1 || 9.0 || 16.1 || 2.0 || 1.4 || 2
|- class=sortbottom
! colspan=3 | Career
! 313 !! 157 !! 141 !! 4587 !! 3045 !! 7632 !! 1121 !! 273 !! 0.5 !! 0.5 !! 14.7 !! 9.7 !! 24.4 !! 3.6 !! 1.9 !! 62
|}

Coaching statistics

|- style="background-color: #EAEAEA"
! scope="row" style="text-align:center; font-weight:normal" | 1996
|style="text-align:center;"|
| 22 || 9 || 13 || 0 || 40.9% || 11 || 16
|-
! scope="row" style="text-align:center; font-weight:normal" | 1997
|style="text-align:center;"|
| 22 || 10 || 12 || 0 || 45.5% || 10 || 16
|- style="background-color: #EAEAEA"
! scope="row" style="text-align:center; font-weight:normal" | 1998
|style="text-align:center;"|
| 22 || 7 || 15 || 0 || 31.8% || 14 || 16
|-
! scope="row" style="text-align:center; font-weight:normal" | 1999
|style="text-align:center;"|
| 22 || 4 || 18 || 0 || 18.2% || 16 || 16
|- 
! colspan=2| Career totals
! 88
! 30
! 58
! 0
! 34.1%
! colspan=2|
|}

Honours and achievements
Team
 AFL premiership player: 1990 (c)

Individual
 Norm Smith Medal: 1990
 AFL Premiership Captain: 1990
 Collingwood Captain: 1987–1993
AFLPA Best Captain Award: 1990
 2× Copeland Trophy: 1984, 1990
 4× State of Origin (Victoria): 1984, 1990, 1991, 1992
 Collingwood Team of the Century 1897-1996 – Interchange
 Collingwood F.C. Hall of Fame: 2004 inductee
 VFL/AFL Team of the Year: 1984, 1990 (c)

Coaching career

Collingwood Football Club senior coach (1996-1999)
After Leigh Matthews was sacked as Collingwood Football Club senior coach at the end of the 1995 season, Shaw would be appointed the senior coach of Collingwood Football Club for the 1996 season, only two seasons after retirement.A leader on the field, Shaw was unsuccessful off the field as a coach. In the 1996 season, he would guide Collingwood to finish in 11th place with nine wins and thirteen losses, and his best effort came in the 1997 season when the club finished 10th with ten wins and twelve losses. In the 1998 season, Collingwood under Shaw finished in 14th place with seven wins and fifteen losses. Shaw then coached the Pies to finish 16th, which is the last position on the ladder to the club's second wooden spoon in the 1999 season with four wins and eighteen losses, earning the accolade of being a premiership captain to coach a wooden spoon side. After that, Shaw resigned as Collingwood Football Club senior coach. Shaw was then replaced by Mick Malthouse as Collingwood Football Club senior coach.

Shaw coached Collingwood Football Club from 1996 until 1999 to a total of 88 games with 30 wins and 58 losses to a winning percentage of 34 percent.

Post-Football
Shaw became a media commentator after his coaching role, commentating on the radio for 3AW Football before joining the Fox Footy Channel as a commentator/special comments for several seasons.

In 1991, Shaw was appointed Moomba Monarch (popularly called King of Moomba).

His son, Brayden, was drafted to Collingwood in 2003, but failed to play a game before being delisted in 2005, before moving on to Port Melbourne in the VFL.

In March 2006, Shaw returned to media focus when he publicly criticized the AFL for the consistent introduction of new rules.

Racism
In 1991 Shaw told journalist Caroline Wilson of The Sunday Age that "I'd make a racist comment every week if I thought it would help win the game. If I think I can say something to upset someone, then I'll say it. I couldn't give a stuff about their race, religion or creed. If they react, you know you've got 'em". However, in 2021, following an independent review of the Collingwood Football Club which found evidence of systemic racism, he denied that the club was racist, stating "I played there for 21 years and coached over that period of time … I never saw anything that meant that this whole club was racist".

''I said it,'' Shaw said in a follow-up 2013 interview with The Age after 22 years of publicly avoiding the matter. ''I was naive and I was wrong. I had this view that what goes on the field, stays on the field. I erred and I've got to wear it.''

References

External links

1960 births
Living people
Collingwood Football Club players
Collingwood Football Club Premiership players
Collingwood Football Club coaches
Norm Smith Medal winners
Copeland Trophy winners
3AW presenters
Australian rules football commentators
Australian Football Hall of Fame inductees
Australian rules footballers from Melbourne
Reservoir Lakeside Football Club players
 Victorian State of Origin players
One-time VFL/AFL Premiership players
People from Reservoir, Victoria